Paras() is a 2015 Pakistani television series produced by Babar Javed under the banner of A&B Productions. It stars Yumna Zaidi and  Sami Khan in leads on their fourth on-screen appearance after Teri Raah Main Rul Gai, Meri Dulari, and Kaanch Ki Guriya. It is written by Rukhsana Nigar and directed by Aamir Yousuf.

Plot 
Aiman finds that her mother is suffering from cancer. Her parents plan a trip to England in hope of better medical treatment. Prior to their departure, they get their cheerful, carefree daughter engaged to Hammad, a good looking boy who is in love with Aiman.

But Fate has other plans for Aiman. Her parents' air plane crashes on their return flight from England. Aiman is informed after her parents' death that she is now left with zero bank balance as her father had spent all his fortune on his beloved wife's treatment.

Cast 

 Yumna Zaidi as Aiman
 Sami Khan as Shehryar
 Ghazala Butt as Shehryar's sister
 Humaira Ali as Sabeen
 Firdous Jamal 
 Harib Farooq as Hammad
Zainab Jameel
Saima Saleem
 Kinza Malik

Soundtrack 
The OST 'Paras Banaya' is sung by Nida Arab and composed by Waqar Ali.

References

External links
Official website

2010s Pakistani television series
Urdu-language television shows